The Rio Grande Bridge at San Juan Pueblo, crossing the Rio Grande near Alcalde, New Mexico, is a Parker pony truss bridge built in 1925.  It was listed on the National Register of Historic Places in 1997.

In the former alignment of the road, it served NM 74.

It was designed by the Monarch Engineering Company of Denver, and consists of four spans, each  in length, each consisting of five panels  in length.  Each of the panels has a top chord at a different diagonal angle, together forming the polygonal top design of a Parker truss.

References

		
National Register of Historic Places in Rio Arriba County, New Mexico
Infrastructure completed in 1925